Miss Polo International is an international beauty pageant with a focus on the sport of polo. It was created in Nigeria by Ibife Alufohai in 2018. It was established help give participants a platform that seeks to bring people from around the world together to promote the participation of women in global activities and improve educational opportunities.

History

The pageant started in Abuja, Nigeria in 2018. Nasneen Sheikh from India, representing Miss Polo India was crowned the first Miss Polo International in Abuja, Nigeria. In 2019, the second edition was hosted in Dubai, United Arab Emirates, Dewanti Kumala from Indonesia, representing Miss Polo Indonesia was crowned as the winner.

Miss Polo International is a non-swimsuit/non-bikini beauty pageant instead participants have five components that go into their score: a project, an interview, fashion, sports wear, and evening gown. The aims of the pagent are to promote education and carry out charitable acts globally, especially in the most impoverished regions of the world. The pageant seeks to promote the beauty found within everyone including emotional intelligence, giftedness, and team spirit. In order to participate in the pageant contestants must have a background in volunteering in their local community. The winner of the pageant serves as an ambassador and works to improve educational initiatives and work to host fundraisers.

Titleholders

References

Beauty pageants for people of specific ethnic or national descents
International beauty pageants
Recurring events established in 2018
2018 establishments in Nigeria